Lists of lighthouses in the United Kingdom cover lighthouses, structures that emit light to serve as navigational aids, in the United Kingdom. They are organized by region. The list for Ireland includes both Northern Ireland and the Republic of Ireland.

Lists

 England
 Ireland
 Scotland
 Wales

See also
 Lists of lighthouses
 Lists of lightvessels
 Lightvessels in the United Kingdom

External links

 

Lighthouses